Buxton TMD was a traction maintenance depot in Buxton, Derbyshire, England. The depot was situated on the west side of the Buxton line, to the immediate north of Buxton station.

The site has subsequently been cleared by DB Schenker, the operator of heavy freight in the area.  

The depot code was BX.

History 
Before its closure in the late 1990s, the depot had an allocation of 104 and 108 DMUs. Stabled locomotives included Classes 08, 20, 25, 31, 37, 45 and 47. Classes 101 and 102 DMUs could also be seen at the depot. The depot was used from 1994 to 1997 as a fuelling point until fuelling facilities were installed at Peak Forest where the stabling of the locos was transferred to.

References

Bibliography

 Railway depots in England
Rail transport in Derbyshire